Danville Area Community College (DACC) is a community college in Danville, Illinois. It was founded in 1946 as an extension of the University of Illinois; it has grown into an independent college offering courses in 76 areas of study. These include college transfer, occupational degrees and certificates, re-training, skill development, customized training and areas of special interest.  As of May 2012, there were 1305 full-time and 3142 part-time students enrolled at the college.

History
In 1946, the University of Illinois opened extension centers in several Illinois towns to help meet the educational needs of World War II veterans.  In Danville, the center was housed at Danville High School under the direction of Principal R. M. Duffin.  The centers were closed in the spring of 1949, and Danville School District 118 decided to continue teaching college classes using the name Danville Community College.  Mary Miller, who had headed the DHS English department, led the new college. At that time the tuition rate was $5.00 per credit hour, with a $5.00 student and library fee.  In 1951, the name was changed to Danville Junior College.

In 1965, the college moved to buildings provided by the US government which had been part of the Veterans Administration on the southeast side of town; this provided the present-day  campus.  Local citizens raised money for the renovation of the buildings.

In June 1966, the college separated from District 118 under the provisions of the Public Junior College Act and became an independent two-year area college under the control of the Board of Trustees of Junior College District No. 507. The name Danville Junior College was changed to Danville Area Community College on July 1, 1979.

Since the campus opened in 1965, several new buildings have been added, including the Mary Miller Center (named for the college's first president and housing the gymnasium and the Sciences division), the Ornamental Horticulture building, the Technology Center, the Child Development Center, and Lincoln Hall.  In addition, several of the existing buildings, dating from the late 1890s, have been renovated, including the Clock Tower Center, Vermilion Hall, Cannon Hall and Prairie Hall. The Bremer Center was expanded in 2007, and the Mary Miller Complex was expanded in 2012.

In 2002, DACC opened the Downtown Center in the heart of downtown Danville in order to facilitate the growing demand for career-preparatory classes.  In 2006 the Downtown Center moved to the Job Training Partnership facility at 407 North Franklin Street.

DACC has hosted the NJCAA Men's Division II Basketball Championship since 1994.  This takes place in the Mary Miller Center Gymnasium.

Presidents
Mary Miller, 1946–1972
William Langas, 1972–1979
Joseph Borgen, 1979–1980
Ronald Lingle, 1980–1989
Harry Braun, 1989–1999
Alice Jacobs, 1999–2016
Stephen Nacco, 2016–present

Cost and residency
Community College District No. 507 encompasses most of Vermilion County, Illinois, along with portions of Edgar, Iroquois, Champaign and Ford counties. As of February 2016, residents of this district, or students who work in-district more than 35 hours per week, pay tuition of $125.00 per credit hour, and all students pay a $15 per credit hour technology / activity fee. Out-of-district students with authorization from their local districts also pay the in-district rate.

Out-of-district students pay $220.00 per credit hour, with the exception of a designated 7-county area in Indiana, covering Vermillion, Parke, Fountain, Warren, Tippecanoe, Benton and Montgomery counties; students in these counties pay $187.50 per credit hour.

As of July 1, 1984, in-district students aged 60 or older pay a tuition rate of $1 per credit hour, as well as applicable course fees.

References

Buildings and structures in Danville, Illinois
Community colleges in Illinois
Education in Vermilion County, Illinois
NJCAA athletics
Sports teams in Danville, Illinois
1946 establishments in Illinois